Tumor necrosis factor, alpha-induced protein 8 is a protein that in humans is encoded by the TNFAIP8 gene.  It is preferentially expressed in human immune cell types.

References

Further reading